Paulo Henrique Miyashiro de Abreu (born June 7, 1976) is an athlete from Brazil.  He competes in triathlon.

Miyashiro competed at the second Olympic triathlon at the 2004 Summer Olympics.  He placed thirty-fourth with a total time of 1:58:16.76.

References

Brazilian male triathletes
Triathletes at the 2003 Pan American Games
Triathletes at the 2004 Summer Olympics
1976 births
Living people
Brazilian people of Japanese descent
Olympic triathletes of Brazil
Pan American Games competitors for Brazil
20th-century Brazilian people
21st-century Brazilian people